Trigonochorium is a genus of tephritid  or fruit flies in the family Tephritidae.

Species
Trigonochorium oculatum Becker, 1913

References

Tephritinae
Tephritidae genera
Taxa named by Theodor Becker